Marquis de Lafayette is an outdoor bronze sculpture of Gilbert du Motier, Marquis de Lafayette by artist Frédéric Auguste Bartholdi, located at Union Square Park in Manhattan, New York.

Description and history
Donated by French residents of New York and dedicated on September 6, 1876, the portrait statue rests on a Quincy granite pedestal. In 1991, it was conserved by the Municipal Art Society and the New York City Art Commission's joint Adopt-A-Monument Program.

See also

 1876 in art

References

External links
 

1876 establishments in New York (state)
1876 sculptures
Bronze sculptures in Manhattan
Cultural depictions of Gilbert du Motier, Marquis de Lafayette
Monuments and memorials in Manhattan
Outdoor sculptures in Manhattan
Sculptures of men in New York City
Statues in New York City
Statues of military officers
Union Square, Manhattan
Sculptures by Frédéric Auguste Bartholdi